Le Quesnoy-en-Artois (literally "Le Quesnoy in Artois") is a commune in the Pas-de-Calais department in the Hauts-de-France region of France.

Geography
Le Quesnoy-en-Artois lies 17 miles (28 km) southeast of Montreuil-sur-Mer at the junction of the D122 and D123 roads.

Population

Places of interest
 The eighteenth-century chateau.
 The church of St.Vaast, dating from the eighteenth century.

See also
Communes of the Pas-de-Calais department

References

Quesnoyenartois
Artois